Ayoub Ouadrassi (Arabic:أيوب الودراسي) (born 23 May 1991) is a Qatari born-Moroccan footballer. He currently plays for Muaither .

References

External links
 

Moroccan footballers
Qatari footballers
1991 births
Living people
Wydad AC players
Al-Gharafa SC players
Muaither SC players
Qatar Stars League players
Qatari Second Division players
Association football wingers
Moroccan emigrants to Qatar
Naturalised citizens of Qatar
Qatari people of Moroccan descent